Saint-Estève XIII Mavericks are a French Rugby league side based in Saint-Estève near Perpignan in the département of Pyrénées-Orientales. Originally known as AS Saint-Estève it was founded in 1965. The club compete in the National Division 2 Languedoc-Roussillon league. Home games are played at the Stade Municipal.

History 
The club was founded in 1965 as Association Sportive Saint-Estève XIII better known as AS Saint-Estève. For a club of its size the success they had was remarkable their best spell was between 1986 and 2000 when they contested 17 finals winning 8 of them. Their best season was 1992-93 when they completed their one and only league and cup double. In 2000 Bernard Guasch brought Saint Esteve and XIII Catalan together to form Union Treiziste Catalane, better known in the English speaking world by their Super League identity of Catalans Dragons. The aim was to get the new club into the Super League which they did in 2006. A presence in the French Elite One Championship was maintained by firstly the retaining of the name Union Treiziste Catalane and then after a rebranding Saint-Esteve XIII Catalan.

Meanwhile, the youth teams which had been set up in 1968  were maintained under a new name Saint-Estève XIII nicknamed the Mavericks. It was then decided that the Elite One club needed a feeder team so the Mavericks introduced a senior side to go along with their junior sides. Thus a new club was born out of an old club while retaining its own identity

Stadium 
Saint-Estève play at the Stade Municipal which is a stadium used for rugby. It has floodlights and a main stand with 2,000 seats. In 2015 it hosted France A match against the Serbia national rugby league team. The stadium is also used by Saint-Estève XIII Catalan in the French Elite One Championship.

Notable players
 Jean-Marc Garcia
 Jerome Guisset

Honours 
 As AS Saint-Estève
 French Championship (6): 1970-71, 1988–89, 1989–90, 1992–93, 1996–97, 1997–98 
 Lord Derby Cup (4): 1972, 1993, 1994, 1995

See also
 French Championship
 Lord Derby Cup
 France National Rugby League Team

References

French rugby league teams
Sport in Pyrénées-Orientales
Catalans Dragons
1965 establishments in France
Rugby clubs established in 1965